Gunnar Söderlindh (10 February 1896 – 26 December 1969) was a Swedish gymnast who competed in the 1920 Summer Olympics. He was part of the Swedish team, which won the gold medal in the gymnastics men's team, Swedish system event in 1920.

References

1896 births
1969 deaths
Swedish male artistic gymnasts
Gymnasts at the 1920 Summer Olympics
Olympic gymnasts of Sweden
Olympic gold medalists for Sweden
Olympic medalists in gymnastics
Medalists at the 1920 Summer Olympics